"Ashita e Kakeru Hashi"(明日へ架ける橋) is Mai Kuraki's 18th single, released on May 19, 2004

Track listing

Charts

Oricon Sales Chart

External links
Mai Kuraki Official Website

2004 singles
Mai Kuraki songs
2004 songs
Songs with music by Akihito Tokunaga
Giza Studio singles
Songs written by Mai Kuraki
Song recordings produced by Daiko Nagato